Robert Cecil Hubbard (December 27, 1922 – August 27, 2011) was an American professional basketball player. Hubbard played in the National Basketball League, Basketball Association of America, New York State Basketball League and American Basketball League in his six-year career. Hubbard played collegiately at Springfield College in Massachusetts and was selected by the Providence Steamrollers in the 1947 BAA draft.

BAA career statistics

Regular season

References

External links

Hubbard's obituary

1922 births
2011 deaths
American Basketball League (1925–1955) players
American men's basketball players
American military personnel of World War II
Basketball players from Massachusetts
Centers (basketball)
Dartmouth College alumni
Forwards (basketball)
People from West Springfield, Massachusetts
Providence Steamrollers draft picks
Providence Steamrollers players
Springfield Pride men's basketball players
Tri-Cities Blackhawks players